The 1976 Metro Conference men's basketball tournament was held March 4–6 at Freedom Hall in Louisville, Kentucky. This was the first edition of the tournament.

Cincinnati defeated  in the championship game, 103–95, to win their first Metro men's basketball tournament.

The Bearcats, in turn, received a bid to the 1976 NCAA Tournament. They were joined by fellow Metro member, and tournament runner-up, Memphis State, who earned an at-large bid.

Format
All six of the conference's members participated in the tournament field. They were seeded based on regular season conference records, with the top two teams earning byes into the semifinal round. The other four teams entered into the preliminary first round.

Bracket

References

Metro Conference men's basketball tournament
Tournament
Metro Conference men's basketball tournament
Metro Conference men's basketball tournament
Basketball competitions in Louisville, Kentucky